Johnston County Career and Technical Leadership Academy (JCCTLA or CTLA) is a public vocational, early college high school in Smithfield, North Carolina, United States. It was established in 2016 and is part of the Johnston County School District. It operates at the Johnston Community College campus.

History 
Johnston County Career and Technical Leadership Academy was established in 2016 and was originally located at Clayton High School. Started by Ed Croom, former superintendent of Johnston County School District, it is a high school "to raise academic achievement while focusing on career and technical education such as health care and computer engineering".

By 2017, space limitations and schedule conflicts at Clayton led to a move to Johnston Community College, where the school replaced the county's successful two year Middle College program. According to The News & Observer, "Middle College and its 5-year-old sibling, Early College, have consistently outperformed other high schools in Johnston, posting high test scores and earning the county’s only A’s from the state."

Curriculum 
The school has five career pathway options which are medical assisting, nurse aide, information technology, applied engineering, and early childhood.

Students at the school are dual enrolled and take classes from both JCC and JCCTLA. The program is five years long, rather than the traditional four that high schools normally have. A high school diploma and an associate degree are both awarded upon graduation.

References

External links 
 

Early College High Schools
Schools in Johnston County, North Carolina
Public high schools in North Carolina
Vocational schools in the United States
Educational institutions established in 2016
2016 establishments in North Carolina